Triphora is a genus of flowering plants from the orchid family, Orchidaceae. It is native to South America, Central America, southern Mexico, the West Indies and eastern North America as far north as Ontario. Noddingcaps is a common name for plants in this genus.

Triphora amazonica Schltr. - Florida, Caribbean, south to Brazil
Triphora carnosula (Rchb.f.) Schltr. - Brazil
Triphora craigheadii Luer - Florida
Triphora debilis (Schltr.) Schltr. - southern Mexico, Costa Rica, Guatemala, Panama 
Triphora duckei Schltr. - Brazil
Triphora foldatsii Carnevali - Venezuela
Triphora gentianoides (Sw.) Nutt. ex Ames & Schltr. - Florida, Southern Mexico, Costa Rica, Veenzuela, Colombia, Ecuador, Bahamas, Greater Antilles
Triphora hassleriana (Cogn. ex Chodat & Hassl.) Schltr. - from Mexico to Argentina
Triphora heringeri Pabst - Brazil
Triphora miserrima (Cogn.) Acuña - Cuba, Hispaniola
Triphora nitida (Schltr.) Schltr. - Costa Rica
Triphora pusilla (Rchb.f. & Warm.) Schltr. - Brazil 
Triphora ravenii (L.O.Williams) Garay - Costa Rica, Panama
Triphora santamariensis Portalet - Brazil 
Triphora surinamensis (Lindl. ex Benth.) Britton - West Indies south to Brazil
Triphora trianthophoros (Sw.) Rydb. Ontario, Eastern United States, much of Mexico
Triphora uniflora A.W.C.Ferreira, Baptista & Pansarin  - Brazil 
Triphora wagneri Schltr. - from Mexico to Ecuador
Triphora yucatanensis Ames - Florida and the Yucatán Peninsula

See also 
 List of Orchidaceae genera

References 

 Pridgeon, A.M., Cribb, P.J., Chase, M.A. & Rasmussen, F. eds. (1999). Genera Orchidacearum 1. Oxford Univ. Press.
 Pridgeon, A.M., Cribb, P.J., Chase, M.A. & Rasmussen, F. eds. (2001). Genera Orchidacearum 2. Oxford Univ. Press.
 Pridgeon, A.M., Cribb, P.J., Chase, M.A. & Rasmussen, F. eds. (2003). Genera Orchidacearum 3. Oxford Univ. Press
 Berg Pana, H. 2005. Handbuch der Orchideen-Namen. Dictionary of Orchid Names. Dizionario dei nomi delle orchidee. Ulmer, Stuttgart

External links 

Triphoreae genera
Triphorinae